Pascali's Island is a novel by Barry Unsworth, first published in 1980. The first United States publication of the book by Simon & Schuster was titled The Idol Hunter.

The film version, produced in (1988), was written and directed by James Dearden. It stars Ben Kingsley, Charles Dance and Helen Mirren.

The novel is set on an island which is an outpost of the Ottoman Empire in 1908.  Basil Pascali is a spy who reports regularly to Istanbul on the activities of the local people.  He expects to be found out at any moment.  When an English archaeologist arrives on the island, Pascali is suspicious of him, and the archaeologist's involvement with the woman Pascali loves creates further tensions.

The novel was shortlisted for the Booker Prize in 1980.

References

1980 British novels
English novels
Novels by Barry Unsworth
Novels set in Greece
Novels set in Turkey
Fiction set in 1908
Novels set on islands
British novels adapted into films
Michael Joseph books